Ligation-independent cloning (LIC) is a form of molecular cloning that is able to be performed without the use of restriction endonucleases or DNA ligase. The technique was developed in the early 1990s as an alternative to restriction enzyme/ligase cloning. This allows genes that have restriction sites to be cloned without worry of chopping up the inserted gene of interest.

Protocol
Design PCR Primers with LIC extension
Perform PCR to amplify gene
Purify PCR product
Create 5' overhangs
Incubate vector and PCR product to anneal
Transform

References

Further reading
LIC Primer Design

Cloning
Molecular biology